Borivoje "Borko" Furht, Ph.D. is a Serbian American scientist, academician, author, consultant, and speaker in the field of computer science and engineering. He is a professor in the department of electrical and computer engineering and computer science (CEECS) at Florida Atlantic University in Boca Raton, Florida. He is also director of the National Science Foundation's Industry and University Cooperative Research Center for Advanced Knowledge Enablement at FAU. In 2019, he was inducted into Academia Europaea, which is The Academy of Europe.

Career

Furht served as a senior researcher in the Institute Boris Kidric-Vinca in Yugoslavia (1970–82), an associate professor at University of Miami in Coral Gables, Florida  (1982–87), and was  vice president of research and a senior director of development at MODCOMP (1987–92). He was senior assistant vice president for engineering and technology at Florida Atlantic University (FAU) (2006–08), chair of FAU's the computer science and engineering department (2002–09) and chair of the department of computer and electrical engineering and computer science (2009–13).

In 2013 and 2019, Furht named Researcher of the Year at Florida Atlantic University.

He was founding editor-in-chief of Springer's journals: Journal of Multimedia Tools and Applications, and Journal of Big Data. He has published over 40 books and 300 research papers in scientific journals and conferences.

References

External links 
 
 Borko Furht publications

Living people
Serbian computer scientists
Serbian emigrants to the United States
University of Miami faculty
Year of birth missing (living people)